Tanner B. Roark (born October 5, 1986) is an American professional baseball pitcher who is a free agent. He has previously played in Major League Baseball for the Washington Nationals, Cincinnati Reds, Oakland Athletics, and Toronto Blue Jays. He played college baseball at the University of Illinois at Urbana-Champaign.

Professional career

Southern Illinois Miners
Roark played one season with the Southern Illinois Miners of the independent Frontier League in 2008.  In 3 games, he was 0–2 with a 21.41 ERA.  In just 9.2 innings, he gave up 23 hits along with 25 runs while striking out 11.

Texas Rangers
Roark was drafted by the Texas Rangers in the 25th round of the 2008 MLB draft. He began his professional career with the rookie ball AZL Rangers, and also appeared with the Single-A Bakersfield Blaze. In 2009, Roark split the year between Bakersfield and the Double-A Frisco RoughRiders, pitching to a cumulative 11-1 record and 3.02 ERA with 100 strikeouts. He was assigned to Frisco to begin the 2010 season.

Washington Nationals
On July 31, 2010, he was traded, along with Ryan Tatusko, to the Washington Nationals in exchange for Cristian Guzmán.

In 2011, he was promoted to the Triple-A Syracuse Chiefs, and posted, in 28 games (26 starts) an unremarkable 6–17 record, but he posted a 4.39 ERA with 7.9 strikeouts and 2.9 walks per nine innings. He began the 2012 season in Syracuse as a starter, then joined the bullpen for 20 relief appearances. Roark moved back to the rotation and had the best stretch of his career, allowing only 12 earned runs over  innings in eight starts.

On August 6, 2013, Roark was called up to the MLB for the first time, and on the next day pitched two innings of scoreless relief, allowing only one hit. By the end of August he had appeared in nine games in relief, allowing earned runs only twice, and compiling an ERA of 1.19 over  innings. On September 7 Roark made his first major league start against the Miami Marlins, pitching six innings, allowing no runs and four hits, no walks, and four strikeouts, getting the win. Roark's dominance continued with a September 17 start against the rival Atlanta Braves in which he pitched seven innings and allowed no runs on just three baserunners. His ERA dropped to 1.08 in  innings. He finished 7–1 in 14 games (5 starts).

On April 26, 2014, Roark threw his first career complete-game shutout (with a perfect game until the 6th), allowing only 3 hits in a 4–0 win over the San Diego Padres. In 31 starts, Roark finished 15–10 with a 2.85 ERA in  innings.

In 2015, Roark was shifted to the bullpen after the team acquired a few starting pitchers. In 40 games (12 starts), Roark finished 4–7 with an ERA of 4.38 in 111 innings.

The 2016 season saw Roark put back in the rotation and establish career bests in wins (16), ERA (2.83), innings (210) and strikeouts (172).  For the 2016 season he led the majors in giving up the lowest percentage of hard-hit balls (24.3%).

In 2017, Roark went 13–11 despite posting a career-worst 4.67 ERA in 32 games (30 starts).  He struck out 166 batters in  innings.

In 2018, Roark went 9–15 with a 4.34 ERA in  innings.

Cincinnati Reds
On December 12, 2018, the Nationals traded Roark to the Cincinnati Reds for Tanner Rainey. On January 11, 2019, the Reds signed Roark to a one-year contract worth $10 million, avoiding arbitration.

In 2019, Roark went 6–7 with a 4.24 ERA in 110.1 innings (21 starts) prior to being traded to the Oakland Athletics on July 31, 2019.

Oakland Athletics
On July 31, 2019, the Reds traded Roark to the Oakland Athletics for Jameson Hannah. In 2019, he allowed the highest line drive percentage of all major league pitchers (17.1%).

Toronto Blue Jays
On December 18, 2019, Roark signed a two-year contract worth $24 million with the Toronto Blue Jays. With the 2020 Toronto Blue Jays, Roark appeared in 11 games, compiling a 2–3 record with 6.80 ERA and 41 strikeouts in  innings pitched.

Roark pitched to a 6.43 ERA in three games for Toronto in 2021, allowing seven runs in as many innings, before being designated for assignment on April 30, 2021. On May 3, the Blue Jays released Roark.

Atlanta Braves
On May 10, 2021, Roark signed a minor league deal with the Atlanta Braves organization. On June 24, Roark was selected to the active roster. After posting a 2.14 ERA in 24 appearances (three starts) for the Gwinnett Stripers, Roark elected free agency on September 5 when he was outrighted off of the 40-man roster.

International career
He was selected Team USA at the 2017 World Baseball Classic as a replacement for Max Scherzer. Roark pitched in relief versus the Dominican Republic, throwing 41 pitches over  innings, allowing two earned runs. Roark started vs Japan in the 2017 WBC semifinals. Roark, who described it as the biggest start of his career, threw 48 pitches over four complete innings, allowing no runs. Under an agreement between Team USA and the Nationals, Roark was limited to no more than 50 pitches. Team USA defeated Japan 2–1 for their first win in WBC semifinal history. Team USA manager Jim Leyland praised Roark's performance post-game saying, "The key tonight, without question, was Tanner Roark."

Pitching style
Roark's main pitch is a sinker at 92 mph (topping out at 96). Against right-handed hitters, he also features a slider at 85 mph. Against lefties he mixes in a curveball at 77 mph and a changeup at 82 mph. He also has a little-used four-seam fastball at 92 mph.

Personal life
Roark and his wife Amanda have two daughters. They had their first son in September 2018.

References

External links

Illinois Fighting Illini bio

1986 births
Living people
Arizona League Rangers players
Bakersfield Blaze players
Baseball players from Illinois
Bravos de Margarita players
American expatriate baseball players in Venezuela
Cincinnati Reds players
Frisco RoughRiders players
Gwinnett Stripers players
Harrisburg Senators players
Illinois Fighting Illini baseball players
Major League Baseball pitchers
Oakland Athletics players
People from Wilmington, Will County, Illinois
Southern Illinois Miners players
Syracuse Chiefs players
Toronto Blue Jays players
Washington Nationals players
World Baseball Classic players of the United States
2017 World Baseball Classic players